Charles Bouillaud (1904–1965) was a French actor.

Selected filmography

1904 births
1965 deaths
French male stage actors
French male film actors
French male television actors
20th-century French male actors